Ladywood Apartments is a historic three-story building in Ogden, Utah. It was built in 1926 by the Upton Masonry Company, whose manager, T.H. Upton, lived in the building, and it was designed in the Spanish Colonial Revival style, possibly by Parkinson & Bergstrom. It has been listed on the National Register of Historic Places since December 31, 1987.

References

Buildings and structures in Ogden, Utah
National Register of Historic Places in Weber County, Utah
Spanish Colonial Revival architecture in the United States
Residential buildings completed in 1926
1926 establishments in Utah